Patara Beach is a beach located near the ancient Lycian city of Patara in Turkey, on the coast of the Turkish Riviera.

See also

 Turkish Riviera

Beaches of Turkey
Landforms of Antalya Province